Fantasy Premier League is the largest fantasy football game, operated and owned by the Premier League. It is free to play and has over 7 million players.

References

Fantasy sports